Gould's razor shell (Solen strictus) is a bivalve mollusc of the family Solenidae. It is common in Japan in sandy coastal zones of the western, southern and northeastern coasts, and also in South Korea, China and Taiwan. It lives on the sandy littoral zone, preferring the depth of about 20–50 cm.

See also
ensis directus (Atlantic jackknife clam)

Solenidae
Bivalves described in 1861
Molluscs of the Pacific Ocean
Fauna of China
Invertebrates of Korea
Molluscs of Japan
Marine molluscs of Asia
Bivalves of Asia